Cruise is an American romantic comedy film, written and directed by Robert D. Siegel. It stars Spencer Boldman, Emily Ratajkowski, Lucas Salvagno, Noah Robbins, Gino Cafarelli, Kathrine Narducci and Sebastian Maniscalco. Filmed in 2015, it was eventually released direct-to-video in September 2018, by Vertical Entertainment.

Plot
Set during the summer of 1987, Cruise focuses on Gio Fortunato, a blue-collar Italian-American who is preoccupied with car racing and chasing women. Life starts to change for Fortunato when he meets Jessica Weinberg, a "nice Jewish girl" from Long Island who ventures into Gio's neighborhood looking for some action.

Cast
 Spencer Boldman as Gio Fortunato 
 Emily Ratajkowski as Jessica Weinberg / Francesca Russo
 Lucas Salvagno as Chris Carbone
 Noah Robbins as Anthony Panagopoulos 
 Gino Cafarelli as Papa Fortunato 
 Kathrine Narducci as Mama Fortunato 
 Sebastian Maniscalco as Dinardo
 Jen Cohen as Mrs. Weintraub
 Grace Wan as herself

Production
In September 2015, it was announced Spencer Boldman and Emily Ratajkowski had joined the cast of the film, with Robert D. Siegel directing from a screenplay he wrote. Alex Garcia, Laura Walker, Holly Brown, and Scott LaStaiti served as producers on the film under their AG Capital banner. UTA Independent Film Group initially held the domestic rights to the film as its financier. In October 2015, Kathrine Narducci and Gino Cafarelli joined the cast of the film. Principal photography started in fall 2015 in New York City. This was Ratajkowski's first starring role, after playing supporting roles in Gone Girl, Entourage, and We Are Your Friends, which had preceded this movie in production.

Release
In May 2018, Vertical Entertainment acquired United States and Canada distribution rights to the film. It was released direct-to-video on September 28, 2018.

Reception
On Rotten Tomatoes the film has an approval rating of  based on reviews from  critics. On Metacritic the film has a score of 46% based on reviews from 4 critics, indicating "mixed or average reviews".

References

External links
 

2018 films
American auto racing films
American romantic comedy films
Films shot in New York City
Vertical Entertainment films
Films set in 1987
2010s English-language films
2010s American films